"405 Method Not Allowed" is the fifth episode in the fourth season of the American thriller drama television series Mr. Robot. Written and directed by series creator Sam Esmail, it aired on November 3, 2019, on USA Network.

The episode is notably presented without dialogue, apart from its opening and ending. In the episode, Elliot (Rami Malek) and Darlene Alderson (Carly Chaikin) execute a heist hack at a server farm on Christmas Day.

Plot 

On Christmas morning, Elliot burns the van and is picked up by Darlene. Elliot and Darlene, posing as an employee, break into Virtual Realty, the company that keeps the servers for Cyprus National Bank. Elliot installs a firmware hack that gives them 40 minutes to get the information they need while temporarily disabling the security cameras. Nearly getting caught, Elliot triggers a power outage which aids their escape. The security team call the police when they realize they've been infiltrated, but only lay eyes on Elliot. He leads the police on a foot chase through Central Park. Darlene is able to walk out, now posing as a gym attendee, and pick up Elliot after he is hit by a car and leaps over a guard rail. Dominique is sent by Janice to the local police department to give the Dark Army control over the van investigation. While meeting with her family, the Central Park incident is on the news. Janice sends her out again to immediately capture Darlene and Elliot, seen on a traffic camera. Elliot texts Price that Tyrell won't be coming to the meeting. Price follows clues to the location of the Deus Group meeting that night; and replies that it'll happen with or without Tyrell. Krista is confronted by Vera.

The episode is presented without dialogue, apart from its opening and ending, beginning with "We don't have to talk" (Darlene to Elliot) and ending with "It's time we talk" (Vera to Krista).

Production 

Series creator Sam Esmail and the show had become known for its defiance of the television format, such as a one-take episode and another with an opening sitcom sequence. Instead of using dialogue, the show depends on text messages and action to tell its story. Esmail said that, in production, the story dictated the format. They knew the plot would center on hacking Virtual Realty and as they worked through the story, realized that Elliot and Darlene would have a coldness between each other, both for the need to be silent and because Darlene would still be mad at Elliot from a prior fight. That the pair would have a silent treatment seemed appropriate to Esmail. They then worked backwards to realize that the episode's other storylines were also silent on Christmas morning. The writers also wanted the silence to contribute to the tension. Each of the subordinate storylines was foreboding, with the viewer left in suspense while knowing what would become of Dom's red light hack and Vera's minions stalking Krista. While the episode lacked dialogue, it was not fully silent, as it remained soundtracked.

Esmail saw this ability to make a stylistic format choice as one of the perks of working in television over feature film, the originally intended format of the show, as the stylistic choice can last for an individual episodic chapter. The silent treatment conceit, Esmail added, additionally expressed isolation as a result of technology, a core theme of the show, with the characters texting rather than talking.

Reception 

The New York Times was "enthralled" by the episode's silence, which it described as functional for the purpose of the hack. Reviewers wrote that the lack of dialogue enhanced other aspects of the presentation, such as the viewer's perception of danger and the significance of the characters' actions, similar to the effect of Buffy the Vampire Slayer "Hush", which was also without dialogue. The New York Times also praised the episode's cinematography in the absence of dialogue, especially in the dark server room lit by server equipment and in the shot descending the staircase. The stairwell shot was also The A.V. Club favorite. Rolling Stone did not notice the absence of dialogue until after the episode, and cited the episode as an example where the "gimmickry" felt "seamless rather than self-indulgent".

With focus on the action and thrill, The A.V. Club thought the show delivered, balancing "apprehension and anxiety" as teased perils turn out to be planned and small errors lead to catastrophic escalation. The New York Times appreciated the running contrast between joyous Christmas music and the characters' stress levels. The New York Times also appreciated how Mr. Robot did not appear either for dialogue or to present Elliot with a way out, but Elliot's jumping from the cliff to meet Darlene did mirror how he thought Mr. Robot pushed him from the Coney Island boardwalk railing. This scene reinforced the show's balance of apprehension and anxiety while underscoring the familial understanding and forgiveness between the siblings, said The A.V. Club.

It was also a Christmas episode notably spent away from usual Christmas elements, such as the tree and shopping.

References

Further reading

External links 
 "405 Method Not Allowed" at USA Network
 

Mr. Robot episodes
2019 American television episodes
American Christmas television episodes